Thomas Edward Forster (born 12 April 1948) is a British set theorist and philosopher. His work has focused on Quine's New Foundations, the theory of well-quasi-orders and better-quasi-orders, and various topics in philosophy.

Forster is an Affiliated Lecturer at DPMMS, Cambridge, a bye-fellow at Queens' College, and holds honorary appointments for many other organisations worldwide, including the Center for Philosophy of Science in Pittsburgh, the Centre National de Recherches de Logique in Belgium, and the Centre for Discrete Mathematics and Theoretical Computer Science at the University of Auckland. Amongst his undergraduate supervisees are Rosi Sexton, Richard Taylor, Rebecca Kitteridge, Doug Gurr, Sarah Flannery and Ursula Martin.

Forster was awarded the J.T. Knight Prize as a PhD student at Cambridge in 1974. His article "The Iterative Conception of Set" was recognised by the Philosophers' Annual as one of the ten best philosophy articles of 2008.

References

External links 
 Forster's website at DPMMS, Cambridge.
 Forster's CV.
 Thomas Edward Forster at the Mathematics Genealogy Project.
T.E. Forster. Set Theory with a Universal Set: Exploring an Untyped Universe. 2nd ed. Oxford Logic Guides, Clarendon Press, 1995.

Cambridge mathematicians
British logicians
Set theorists
1948 births
Living people